Ian Gooding-Edghill is a Barbadian politician and businessman. He has served as a member of parliament in the Parliament of Barbados.

References 

Living people
Barbadian politicians
Barbados Labour Party politicians
Year of birth missing (living people)